Abu Qir Fertilizers and Chemical Industries Co SAE  (ABUK.CA) is a former state-owned company that is one of the largest producers of nitrogen fertilizers in Egypt and the Middle East. It produces about 50% of the Egyptian Nitrogen Fertilizers. The company and the 1st Ammonia Urea plant was established at 1976. It is located at Abu Qir Bay, 20 kilometers east of Alexandria.

References

External links

 Official ABU QIR Fertilizers and Chemicals Industries Company website

Fertilizer companies of Egypt
Agriculture companies established in 1976
Chemical companies established in 1976
Egyptian companies established in 1976